Langerkey is a village located in Narowal District, Punjab, Pakistan. The complete name of this village is Langerkey Bhattian ( لنگرکے بھٹیاں). The Bhatti caste represents 90% of the people in this village and it is the reason why the village is named Langerkey Bhattian. Other castes present are barbar, new Muslims and khokhars.

Union Council Langerkey
The Union Council for 28 villages is also located in Langerkey. The Govt. Elementary School, Govt. Girls School, Madrasa, 4 mosques and cricket grounds are also located in this village.

Bio Data
Langerkey was known for its Kabaddi team as Mr. Yaseen Pehlwan was captain of the Army Kabbadi team. Langerkey is also known for its cricket and volleyball teams. This village occupies nearly 3 km area of the District Narrowal.  

Villages in Narowal District